René Charlet (April 26, 1903 – July 18, 1971) was a French bobsledder who competed from the mid-1930s to the late 1940s. Competing in two Winter Olympics, he earned his best finish of 9th in the four-man event at St. Moritz in 1948. In 1936 he failed to finish in the four-man event.

References

1936 bobsleigh four-man results
1936 Olympic Winter Games official report. - p. 416.
1948 bobsleigh four-man results

1903 births
1971 deaths
French male bobsledders
Olympic bobsledders of France
Bobsledders at the 1936 Winter Olympics
Bobsledders at the 1948 Winter Olympics